Ecitoxenidia is a genus of rove beetles in the family Staphylinidae. There are about five described species in Ecitoxenidia.

Species
These five species belong to the genus Ecitoxenidia:
 Ecitoxenidia alabamae Seevers, 1959 i c g b
 Ecitoxenidia ashei Kistner in Kistner, Ashe and Jacobson, 1996 i c g
 Ecitoxenidia brevicornis Seevers, 1959 i c g
 Ecitoxenidia brevipes (Brues, 1902) i c g
 Ecitoxenidia longicornis (Borgmeier, 1949) i c g
Data sources: i = ITIS, c = Catalogue of Life, g = GBIF, b = Bugguide.net

References

Further reading

 
 
 
 

Aleocharinae
Articles created by Qbugbot